Spanish is a town in the Canadian province of Ontario, located on Trans-Canada Highway 17 in the Algoma District near the border of the Sudbury District. Formerly known as the Township of Shedden, the municipality adopted its current status and name in 2004, taking the name of its largest community.

The Town of Spanish is situated at the mouth of the Spanish River where it empties into the North Channel of Lake Huron. This river and its ecologically rich delta have had a positive impact on the development of the community of Spanish. The river has played an important and continuous role in the local economy from the days of the fur trade, through the timbering era, and now contributes to the tourism industry.

History

According to legend, the Spanish name was derived around the year 1750. Numerous persons have attempted to explain the rationale for the name "Spanish" in what was once historically part of New France. There are several different theories regarding the name of the community. According to local legends a French Jesuit Father was travelling in the area in the 1700s and encountered a Spanish speaking woman with children. The woman had been captured by local warriors in a battle in Spanish controlled lands far to the south in what is now the United States of America, and had been married to a local Ojibway chief, the family taking the name "Espaniel". Espaniel is a common surname among the local Ojibway communities. Another variant of the story has it that it was in fact a Spaniard who had fled the Spain-controlled lower Mississippi Valley during the fur trade days and had taken refuge along the North Shore and married into a local Ojibway community.
Other theories on the name of Spanish include a claim that Dr. J.J. Bigsby, a geologist with the Canadian Boundary Commission, named the river to contrast with the nearby French River. Further intrigue arises from the 1980 discovery of two Spanish coins
from 1742 found near the mouth of the Sauble River. This has led to speculation of very early Spanish-speaking explorers along the North Shore. The Spanish River has had numerous names since names were recorded. John McBean, HBC Factor at the La Cloche Trading Post recorded the name Eskimanetigon in his map of 1824. Elder Peter Owl  of Sagamok states the name has traditionally been Minitegozibe. The Ministry has named a Provincial Park on the upper river The Spanish River Valley Minitegoibe Signature site.
Early settlement of the area gained momentum in the latter part of the 1800s with the completion of the Canadian Pacific Railway in February 1884, between Lake Nipissing and Algoma, now known as Algoma Mills. According to an article in the Ontario Gazetteer, by 1903–1904, the Spanish River Station (the railway designation for Spanish) had a population of approximately 200 with two timber companies operating in the vicinity: Huron Lumber Co. and Spanish River Co. W. H. Graham operated a general store, William Coget ran the hotel and the local blacksmith as well as the Postmaster was Gustavo Hamilton.

During the same year (1903–1904), the community of Spanish Mills, located on Aird Island in the North Channel just south of the Town of Spanish, also had a thriving timber industry complete with a sawmill, schoolhouse, and general store. The Sable and Spanish River Boom and Dam Co. and the Spanish River Lumber Company.

Residential Schools  

The earliest version of the Spanish Indian Residential Schools was originally a log cabin in Wiikwemkoong, Manitoulin Island from 1850–1911. It was a day school for Native boys. Father Proulx was the first priest. In 1860 the Jesuit Priests managed the school. The old school burned down and a new site was chosen,  were purchased at the mouth of the Spanish River. Reverend Joseph Sauve and Father Paquin undertook to build, design and supervise construction. In the fall of 1913 the school commenced. Boys from as far as Manitoba and as close as Cutler (Serpent River First Nations) attended the school.

A shoe-maker shop and a pump house were built. Self-sufficient dormitories, classrooms, several lavatories, kitchen, a scullery, pantry, refrigerated area, corridors, offices, cloistered area, laundry room, infirmary, bakery and tailor shop were housed in the school. Near the school stood a wind mill powerhouse and shoe shop, a mill and a storage for milled products, a huge barn which held cows, several horse teams, a bull, a dairy operation and a blacksmith shop, a piggery and sheepery, a chicken coop and a garden. At the wharf was a  cruiser named the Garnier and a vessel called Red Bug were tied up.

Likewise in Wiikwemkoong a Native School for girls was located. It was run by the Daughters of the Heart of Mary from 1862–1914. The log cabin burned down in 1916 and was relocated opposite the boys school in Spanish. Both schools were funded by the Federal Government. The Indian Act stated that "Indians can attend a residential school if an Indian Day School is not available to them within a three mile (5 km) radius." Children from broken homes and where home conditions were not the best were also sent to be enrolled into the schools.

The Daughters of the Heart of Saint Mary was an organization formed by and idea from a young French woman who hoped for a life of religion to a woman whose responsibilities kept them in the world. This idea occurred to a Jesuit priest when the woman approached him during the French Revolution. The Society was founded in 1790 and was forced to go underground. The society came to Canada 100 years ago to work among the natives in Ontario.

In 1981 the building which was the former "Girls School" burned down and the "Boys School" was demolished in 2004. The shell of the "Girls School" still remains as a witness to history.

Timeline

 1902: Railway station is built, the village's focus shifts to becoming a small service centre for the Canadian Pacific Railway instead of a lumber village.
 1911: Wiikwemkoong's missionary school on Manitoulin Island is destroyed by a fire. The church wants to rebuild a new school in Spanish near the rail line away from the Wiikwemkoong village and so the Jesuit purchase an acre of land at the mouth of the Spanish River and erect St. Peter's Clavier's School, later Garnier College, for 180 boys and St. Joseph's School for 150 girls.
 1913: Garnier School opens.
 1916: The St. Joseph Residential School is built.
 1917: A voter's list is created.
 1918: Flu epidemic takes many lives.
 1922: A telephone exchange was installed in the Post Office.
 1926: Spanish Mills was closed down.
 1951: Spanish receives electricity.
 1956: Noranda Inc. opens a Sulphuric Acid Plant on the Serpent River First Nations Reserve. Since only chief officials are allowed to live on the reserve, Noranda purchases land at the east end of Spanish for a residential town site where the employees can live and therefore boosts the population to 12,000. Since Spanish is the nearest community to the mines in Elliot Lake, the town becomes the transportation centre for mail and freight.
 1957: The North Theatre opens. 42 Homes are constructed. The telephone exchange office is built and a bank is established.
 1958: Garnier College is closed.
 1962: St. Joseph's School is closed.
 1973: The Township of Shedden experiences its first form of municipal government by joining the Improvement District of the North Shore.
 1975: First direct distance dialing.
 1978: The elected council changes the name to The Township of the North Shore. The first library is established where Small Bites Groceries now exists.
 1980: The library is moved to a pre-fab beside the fire hall.
 1981: The Improvement District of the North Shore and the Township of Shedden separate. The former St. Joseph Residential School building burns down.
 1985: The Township of Shedden separates from The North Shore and becomes the Improvement District of Shedden with an appointed Board of Trustees.
 1989: The Township of Shedden is created, electing its own independent council.
 1992: Township of Shedden and Public Library opens. A medical clinic and farmers market open.
 1995: A Dental clinic opens.
 1997: A Municipal Marina opens.
 1998: Gignac Square opens.
 1999: Four Season Waterfront Complex opens.
 2004: Former Garnier residential School is demolished. Lake Huron North Channel Historic Trail is completed. Council gives Third reading to By-Law 2004-39 changing the name of the Community from the Township of Shedden to the Corporation of the Town of Spanish.

Demographics 

Population trend:
 Population in 2016: 712
 Population in 2011: 696
 Population in 2006: 728
 Population in 2001: 816
 Population in 1996: 899
 Population in 1991: 927

Economy

Forestry is the main industry of Spanish, employing 64% of the population.

Spanish has two schools; Spanish Public School, located on the north side of town and École Ste-Anne located on the South.

The Spanish Public Library offers a variety of services for the local community and travelling tourists. The library has an extensive children's section, access to high speed internet, fax machine, photocopier, and a wide range of books and magazines. The Spanish Public Library also sponsors the annual Spanish Easter egg hunt, which takes place on the Saturday before Easter.

Spanish hosted a summer rock concert called "Rock N' Roar" from 2010 to 2016, attracting hundreds of people to the small Northern Ontario community. The annual concert was cancelled in June 2017 due to low ticket sales, especially in light of the events taking place to celebrate Canada's 150th anniversary.

Transportation

The town is served by Highway 17, an Ontario section of the Trans-Canada Highway. Ontario Northland provides intercity motor coach service to Spanish as a stop along its Sault Ste. Marie–Sudbury–North Bay–Ottawa route, with one bus a day each headed eastbound and westbound from Sunday to Friday, with no service on Saturdays.

See also
List of townships in Ontario

References

External links

Municipalities in Algoma District
Single-tier municipalities in Ontario
Towns in Ontario
Spanish River (Ontario)